is a Japanese trio currently performing in the Japanese professional wrestling promotion World Wonder Ring Stardom. The trio currently consists of Mina Shirakawa, Xia Brookside and Mariah May as a sub-unit of Cosmic Angels.

History

Formation (2022–present)
At Stardom's Dream Queendom 2, the returning Xia Brookside and the debutant Mariah May made their appearances by accompanying Mina Shirakawa to the ring. Shirakawa and Unagi Sayaka who represented Cosmic Angels went on defeating Donna Del Mondo's Mai Sakurai and Thekla in a tag team match. Following the bout, Shirakawa slapped Unagi, and announced the formation of her own trio featuring herself, May, and Brookside with the three to be known as Club Venus. The newly formed announced themselves as the mystery team to compete in the Triangle Derby I tournament as part of the "Red Triangle Block" where they scored a total of eight points after going against the teams of  Abarenbo GE (Syuri, Mirai and Ami Sourei), Gold Ship (Natsuko Tora, Momo Watanabe and Saki Kashima), Prominence (Suzu Suzuki, Risa Sera and Hiragi Kurumi), Rebel&Enemy (Ram Kaicho, Maika Ozaki and Maya Yukihi), MaiHime with C (Maika, Himeka and Lady C), Classmates (Hazuki, Koguma and Saya Iida), and Lollipop (Waka Tsukiyama, Yuko Sakurai and Rina Amikura). The trio was confirmed as a sub-unit of Cosmic Angels by Shirakawa herself.

At Stardom New Blood 7 on January 20, 2023, Xia Brookside and Mariah May fell short to Unique Glare (Starlight Kid and Karma) in the quarterfinals of the inaugural New Blood Tag Team Championship tournament. At Stardom Supreme Fight 2023 on February 4, 2023, Mina Shirakawa and Mariah May competed in a call your shot match for a title of choice.

Members

Current

Sub-groups

Current

Notes

References

External links 

 

Independent promotions teams and stables
Japanese promotions teams and stables
Women's wrestling teams and stables
World Wonder Ring Stardom teams and stables